Wouter Biebauw (born 21 May 1984) is a Belgian former professional footballer who played as a goalkeeper.

External links
 
 

1984 births
Living people
People from Deerlijk
Belgian footballers
Footballers from West Flanders
Association football goalkeepers
Belgian Pro League players
Challenger Pro League players
K.S.V. Roeselare players
K.V. Mechelen players
K.V. Oostende players
K.R.C. Zuid-West-Vlaanderen players
K Beerschot VA players